Slagle is an unincorporated community in Polk County, in the U.S. state of Missouri.

History
A post office called Slagle was established in 1874, and remained in operation until 1905. The community is named after the local Slagle family.

References

Unincorporated communities in Polk County, Missouri
Unincorporated communities in Missouri